Sir John Patrick Graham (26 November 1906 – 5 December 1993) was a British barrister and High Court judge. A leading intellectual property law specialist, he sat in the Chancery Division of the High Court from 1969 to 1981, where he was senior Patent Judge.

The son of Alexander Graham, a Shrewsbury-based barrister, and Mary Adeline Cock, Patrick Graham was educated at Shrewsbury School and Gonville and Caius College, Cambridge, where he read Classics, then Law. Called to the Bar by the Middle Temple in 1930, he completed his pupillage with Lionel Heald in the chambers of Sir Stafford Cripps, which he joined. During the Second World War, Graham served with the Royal Air Force Volunteer Reserve and later at Supreme Headquarters Allied Expeditionary Force. He was demobilised in 1945 with the rank of group captain.

References 

Knights Bachelor
Chancery Division judges
People from Shrewsbury
People educated at Shrewsbury School
Alumni of Gonville and Caius College, Cambridge
Royal Air Force Volunteer Reserve personnel of World War II
English King's Counsel
20th-century King's Counsel
1906 births

1993 deaths